An electrochromic device (ECD) controls optical properties such as optical transmission, absorption, reflectance and/or emittance in a continual but reversible manner on application of voltage (electrochromism). This property enables an ECD to be used for applications like smart glass, electrochromic mirrors, and electrochromic display devices.

History 
The history of electro-coloration goes back to 1704 when Diesbach discovered Prussian blue (hexacyanoferrate), which changes color from transparent to blue under oxidation of iron. In the 1930s, Kobosew and Nekrassow first noted electrochemical coloration in bulk tungsten oxide. While working at Balzers in Lichtenstein, T. Kraus provided a detailed description of the electrochemical coloration in a thin film of tungsten trioxide (WO3) on 30 July 1953. In 1969, S. K. Deb demonstrated electrochromic coloration in WO3 thin films. Deb observed electrochromic color by applying an electric field on the order of 104 Vcm−1 across WO3 thin film. In fact, the real birth of the EC technology is usually attributed to S. K. Deb’s seminal paper of 1973, wherein he described the coloration mechanism in WO3. The electrochromism occurs due to the electrochemical redox reactions that take place in electrochromic materials. Various types of materials and structures can be used to construct electrochromic devices, depending on the specific applications.

Device structure 

Electrochromic (sometimes called electrochromatic) devices are one kind of electrochromic cells.  The basic structure of ECD consists of two EC layers separated by an electrolytic layer. The ECD works on an external voltage, for which the conducting electrodes are used on the either side of both EC layers. Electrochromic devices can be categorized in two types depending upon the kind of electrolyte used viz. Laminated ECD are the one in which liquid gel is used while in solid electrolyte EC devices solid inorganic or organic material is used. The basic structure of electrochromic device embodies five superimposed layers on one substrate or positioned between two substrates in a laminated configuration. In this structure there are three principally different kinds of layered materials in the ECD: The EC layer and ion-storage layer conduct ions and electrons and belong to the class of mixed conductors. The electrolyte is a pure ion conductor and separates the two EC layers. The transparent conductors are pure electron conductors. Optical absorption occurs when electrons move into the EC layers from the transparent conductors along with charge balancing ions entering from the electrolyte.

Solid-state devices 
In solid-state electrochromic devices, a solid inorganic or organic material is used as the electrolyte. Ta2O5 and ZrO2 are the most extensively studied inorganic solid electrolytes.

Laminated devices 
Laminated electrochromic devices contain a liquid gel which is used as the electrolyte.

Mode of operation 

Typically, ECD are of two types depending on the modes of device operation, namely the transmission mode and reflectance mode. In the transmission mode, the conducting electrodes are transparent and control the light intensity passing through them; this mode is used in smart-window applications.  In the reflectance mode, one of the transparent conducting electrodes (TCE) is replaced with a reflective surface like aluminum, gold or silver, which controls the reflective light intensity; this mode is useful in rear-view mirrors of cars and EC display devices.

Applications

Smart windows 

Electrochromic windows, also known as smart windows, are a technology for energy efficiency in buildings by controlling the amount of sunlight passing through.
They can also produce less glare than fritted glass. Their efficiency depends on their placement, size, and weather, which affect the amount of sunlight exposure. 

These windows usually contain layers for tinting in response to increases in incoming sunlight and to protect from UV radiation. For example the glass developed by Gesimat, has a  tungsten oxide layer, a polyvinyl butyral layer and a Prussian Blue layer sandwiched by two dual layers of glass and fluorine-doped glass coated with tin oxide. The tungsten oxide and Prussian Blue layers form the positive and negative ends of a battery using the incoming light energy. The polyvinyl butyral (PVB) forms the central layer and serves as a polymer electrolyte. This allows for the flow of ions which, in turn, generates a current.

Mirrors 
Electrochromic reflecting surfaces are used as self darkening mirrors that regulate reflections of flashing light from following vehicles at night so that a driver can see them without discomfort.

Other displays 
Electrochromic displays can operate in either reflecting or transmitting mode. They are cheap and consume little power.

Other applications include dynamically tinting goggles and motorcycle helmet visors, and special paper for drawing on with a stylus.

Gallery

References

Optical devices